Kosmos 205 ( meaning Cosmos 205), was a Soviet satellite launched from the Plesetsk Cosmodrome, Soviet Union, on March 5, 1968. The R-7 Semjorka launch vehicle with an added degree set the satellite into orbit around the planet Earth. Kosmos 205 was an observation satellite.

See also

 1968 in spaceflight

References

Spacecraft launched in 1968
Kosmos satellites